A Turnerschaft is a kind of Studentenverbindung, a German student corporation, similar to fraternities in the US and Canada. The Turnerschaften are a sports corps, and students practice the Mensur (academic fencing).

Most Turnerschaften are members of either the Coburger Convent or the Marburger Convent.

Notable Turnerschaft members
Christoph Ahlhaus
Karl Andree
Heinrich Biltz
Adolf Butenandt
Otto Dempwolff
Max Eckert-Greifendorff
Franz Etzel
Carl Friedrich Goerdeler
Hugo Junkers
Friedrich August Kekulé von Stradonitz
Eckart von Klaeden
Hermann Löns
Gottfried Münzenberg
Ferdinand Sauerbruch

Literature 
 Edwin A. Biedermann, "Logen, Clubs und Bruderschaften", Droste-Verlag, 2007, 2.AUfl.,  415 Seiten

External links 
 Coburger Convent - Dachverband der akademischen Landsmannschaften und Turnerschaften

Student societies in Germany
German words and phrases
Fencing organizations
Historical fencing
Fencing in Germany